Colin Douglas Fisher (born 27 December 1949) is a Scottish Rugby union player and administrator.

He also played for Waterloo R.F.C. He is the son of Alastair Fisher, who was also capped for Scotland.

He played 7 times for the Scotland, but two of those games were versus Japan and that time that didn't count for a full cap, his other caps came in matches against Australia, England, Ireland, New Zealand and Wales.

After an injury to his left knee cartilage he never returned to training. After retiring he became involved in administration of Rugby and was involved in controversial incidents involving sponsors and drunken behaviour in 2005. he has also been president of Waterloo R.F.C. of Liverpool. He is a chartered surveyor by profession.

References

Bath, Richard (ed.) The Scotland Rugby Miscellany (Vision Sports Publishing Ltd, 2007 )
Colin Fisher's profile at ESPN Scrum

1949 births
Living people
Army rugby union players
Lancashire County RFU players
Scotland international rugby union players
Scottish rugby union players
Waterloo R.F.C. players